Events from the year 1879 in Russia.

Incumbents
 Monarch – Alexander II

Events

 
 
  
  
 Kharkov Mathematical Society

Births

 Leon Trotsky, Soviet statesman.

Deaths

 - Innocent of Alaska, Russian Orthodox missionary priest, Orthodox bishop and archbishop in the Americas, and Metropolitan of Moscow and all Russia. (b. 1797)

References

1879 in Russia
Years of the 19th century in the Russian Empire